This page lists the World Best Year Performances in the year 1985 in the Men's hammer throw. The women did not compete in the hammer throw until the early 1990s. Soviet Union's Yuriy Sedykh had set the world record in the previous (1984) season.

Records

1985 World Year Ranking

References
digilander.libero
apulanta
hammerthrow.wz

1985
Hammer Throw Year Ranking, 1985